Dan Quayle is a politician from the state of Indiana. Quayle represented Indiana's 4th congressional district in the United States House of Representatives from 1977 to 1981. Quayle upset 3-term incumbent United States Senator Birch Bayh in 1980 as part of the Republican landslide, which saw the party gain 12 seats and the majority in the United States Senate and Ronald Reagan elected president. In 1988, Quayle was chosen by U.S. Vice President George H. W. Bush, the Republican presidential nominee as his running mate and elected the nation's 44th vice president, serving from January 20, 1989 to January 20, 1993.

United States House of Representatives

United States Senate

Presidential elections

1988

1992

References

Quayle, Dan
Dan Quayle